Gregory Duane Locke (born May 18, 1976) is an American Christian pastor. He is the founder of Global Vision Bible Church in Mount Juliet, Tennessee.

Early life 
Locke was born in Donelson Hospital in Nashville, Tennessee, in 1976. His father was imprisoned during Locke's early life, and his mother remarried when he was 5; Locke had a turbulent relationship with his stepfather.

Following multiple arrests, Locke was sent to a children's home at the age of 15, where he converted to Christianity.

Career 
Locke founded Global Vision Baptist Church in 2006. In 2011, the church officially split from the Independent Baptist movement and changed its name to Global Vision Bible Church.

In 2016 Greg Locke posted a Facebook video in which he criticized changes to Target's bathroom policy. As of April 2022, Locke's social media audience numbers in the millions. In September 2021, Locke was permanently suspended from Twitter, but his account was later reinstated.

Locke kept his church open through outbreaks of COVID-19, and claimed that it was is a "fake pandemic". He said that those who wore masks to his church would be asked to leave, and discouraged his congregation from getting vaccinated.

Locke was present during the January 6 attack on the Capitol. Afterwards, Locke condemned the violence but maintained that it had been instigated by antifa.

Locke has been a speaker at several stops on the Reawaken America tour, which feature conspiracy theories about vaccines and the 2020 presidential election.

On January 23, 2022, Locke claimed that OCD and autism are "demonic possessions", which was condemned by neurodivergent rights movements and the Autism Faith Network.

On February 2, 2022, Locke held a burning of "witchcraft" books from the Twilight and Harry Potter series. During a sermon on February 13, he claimed to have discovered six witches within his congregation during an exorcism and threatened to expose their names.

Personal life 
Locke met his first wife, Melissa Biggers, at Good Shepherd Children's Home while he was there as a ward of the state; Biggers was among the facility's staff. In 1995, Locke and Biggers became engaged. They have four children, two of whom are adopted. In January 2018, Locke confirmed in a video posted to Facebook that he and Biggers had separated, and the divorce was finalized in May.

In 2018 Locke married Taisha (Tai) McGee, his administrative assistant and his ex-wife's best friend.

References 

Living people
1976 births
People from Nashville, Tennessee
American conspiracy theorists
Baptists from Tennessee
COVID-19 conspiracy theorists
21st-century Baptist ministers from the United States
Independent Baptist ministers from the United States
21st-century American businesspeople
Businesspeople from Tennessee
Protesters in or near the January 6 United States Capitol attack